The Swan of Tuonela is an 1895 tone poem by the Finnish composer Jean Sibelius.

The Swan of Tuonela was originally composed in 1893 as the prelude to a projected opera called The Building of the Boat. Sibelius revised it two years later, making it the second section of his  of four tone poems, which was premiered in 1896. He twice further revised the piece, in 1897 and 1900. Sibelius left posterity no personal account of his writing of the tone poem, and its original manuscript no longer exists (the date of its disappearance is unknown). The work was first published by K. F. Wasenius in Helsingfors (Helsinki), Finland, in April 1901. The German firm Breitkopf & Härtel also published it in Leipzig, also in 1901. The work was recorded for the first time by Leopold Stokowski and the Philadelphia Orchestra in May 1929.

Structure 
The tone poem is scored for a small orchestra of cor anglais, oboe, bass clarinet, two bassoons, four horns, three trombones, timpani, bass drum, harp, and divided strings. The cor anglais is the voice of the swan, and its solo is one of the best known solos in the orchestral literature for that instrument. The music paints a gossamer, transcendental image of a mystical swan floating through Tuonela, the realm of the dead.  , the hero of the epic, has been tasked with killing the sacred swan; but on the way, he is shot with a poisoned arrow and dies.  In the next part of the story he is restored to life.

References

External links
 

Symphonic poems by Jean Sibelius
1895 compositions
Compositions for English horn
Music about swans
Music based on the Kalevala